The name Joyce has been used for three tropical cyclones in the Atlantic Ocean, three tropical cyclones in the Eastern Pacific Ocean, and one tropical cyclone in the Australian region. It was used in the Pacific on the old four-year lists. In the Atlantic, it replaced Joan which was retired following the 1988 season.

Atlantic Ocean:
 Hurricane Joyce (2000) – approached the Windward Islands.
 Tropical Storm Joyce (2012) – did not affect land.
 Tropical Storm Joyce (2018) – did not affect land.

Pacific Ocean:
 Tropical Storm Joyce (1966) – stayed at sea.
 Tropical Storm Joyce (1970) – did not affect land.
 Hurricane Joyce (1974) – a strong Category 1 hurricane which did not affect land.

Australian Region:
 Cyclone Joyce (2018)

Pacific hurricane set index articles
Atlantic hurricane set index articles
Australian region cyclone set index articles